Hutchinson County is the name of two counties in the United States:

 Hutchinson County, South Dakota 
 Hutchinson County, Texas